Marcara Avanchintz was a 17th-century powerful Armenian trader from Ispahan, Persia, who went into the service of Louis XIV. He became a Director of the newly founded French East Indian Company, together with François Caron, who was his direct superior, and Jean-François Leriget de La Faye.

Marcara arrived in India, at the kingdom of Golconda where he had great connections, in May 1669, and was successful in obtaining a trade agreement (a farmân) for the French.

Marcara however entered into a dispute with Caron, after Caron offered him to take personal bribes in the French East Indian Company trade. Maracara was imprisoned on accusations that he was favouring Armenian trade, and returned to France. Upon his return, Marcara initiated a trial against the French East Indian Company, which he won.

On this assignment François Martin wrote:

Notes

References
Baghdiantz McCabe, Ina 2008 Orientalism in early Modern France Berg 
Baghdiantz McCabe, Ina 1999 The Shah’s Silk for Europe’s Silver: The Eurasian Silk trade of the Julfan Armenians in Safavid Iran and India (1590-1750) University of Pennsylvania (Series in Armenian Texts and Studies), Scholar’s Press, Chapter 10.
Businesspeople from Isfahan
Armenian diplomats
Persian Armenians